Peter Hidden is an Australian jurist who served as a Justice of the Supreme Court of New South Wales from October 16, 1995 until 2016. Prior to this, Hidden worked as a public defender.

Other activities
Hidden is known for his singing, and founded the New South Wales Bar Choir in 1995. As well, he sits on the board of directors of the Pacific Opera.

References

Living people
Year of birth missing (living people)
Judges of the Supreme Court of New South Wales